Garsen is a small town located in Tana River County, Kenya. It is on the west bank of the Tana River.

Location

Overview
Garsen marks the western end of the  Garsen–Witu–Lamu Highway.

See also
List of roads in Kenya

References

External links
Website of Tana River County

Populated places in Tana River County